Büyükoturak is a small belde (town) in Banaz  district of Uşak Province, Turkey. At  it is situated to the south of Turkish state highway  which connects Uşak and İzmir to Central Anatolia. The population of Büyükoturak is 895  as of 2011. The antiques found close to the railway station are from the Bronze Age. But the settlement was founded during the Ottoman Empire era by the nomads. In 1957 it was declared a seat of township. Orcharding is the main economic sector of the town. There is also a coal seam around the town

Transport
 The nearest airport close to Büyükoturak is Afyon Airport and Denizli Çardak Airport.

References

External links 
Images of the town

Populated places in Banaz District
Towns in Turkey